Ilya Snițari (born 20 March 2002) is a Moldovan tennis player.

Snițari has a career high ATP singles ranking of World No. 479 achieved on 19 December 2022. He also has a career high ATP doubles ranking of World No. 404, achieved also on 19 December 2022. Snițari has won 2 singles and 5 doubles ITF titles. 

Snițari has represented Moldova at Davis Cup. In Davis Cup he has a win-loss record of 9-3.

ITF and Challenger finals

Singles: 5 (2–3)

Doubles 10 (5–5)

Davis Cup

Participations: (9–3)

   indicates the outcome of the Davis Cup match followed by the score, date, place of event, the zonal classification and its phase, and the court surface.

References

External links

2002 births
Living people
Moldovan male tennis players
21st-century Moldovan people